Petřín is a hill in the centre of Prague, Czech Republic. It rises 327 m above sea level and some 130 m above the left bank of the Vltava River. The hill, almost entirely covered with parks, is a favorite recreational area for the inhabitants of Prague. The hill (in German known as Laurenziberg) is featured prominently in Franz Kafka's early short story "Description of a Struggle" and briefly in Milan Kundera's novel The Unbearable Lightness of Being.

The chronicler Cosmas describes Petřín as a very rocky place, the hill is allegedly called Petřín because of the large number of rocks (Latin: petra). Since ancient times, stones were dug and were used to construct buildings in Prague. Medieval defence wall, the Hunger Wall was built on Petřín Hill during 1360 - 1362, by the order of king of Bohemia Charles IV. The Petřín Lookout Tower, which strongly resembles the Eiffel Tower, was built atop a hill in 1891. Other sights include the Rose Garden, Mirror Maze, Cathedral of Saint Lawrence, and St Michael Church.

The summit of the hill is linked to Prague's Malá Strana district by the Petřín funicular, a funicular railway that first operated in 1891.

Main sights 
 Petřín lookout tower
 Petřín funicular
 Hunger Wall
 Mirror Maze
 Rose Garden
 Štefánik's Observatory
 Strahov Stadium
 St Lawrence Cathedral
 St. Michael the Archangel Church (wooden church from the second half of the 17th century in Boyko style, transferred from Subcarpathian Ruthenia in 1929)
 Memorial to the Victims of Communism

References

 
Mountains and hills of Prague